San Francisco Oxtotilpan is a village in located in the municipality of Temascaltepec in the state of Mexico, Mexico.

References

Populated places in the State of Mexico
Temascaltepec
Matlatzinca settlements